Lindsey Earner-Byrne is the Professor of Irish Gender history at University College Cork, Ireland and author of Irish history books.

Biography
Dr Lindsey Earner-Byrne is a historian focusing on modern Irish history. She was a lecturer in the School of History at University College Dublin. Her research has covered gender, health and welfare with a particular interest in sexual violence.  Earner-Byrne became the SALI Chair of Irish Gender History at UCC in January 2021. Earner-Byrne is on the Board of the Irish Manuscripts Commission. She's a member of the Royal Irish Academy.

Bibliography

Books
 Mother and Child: Maternity and Child Welfare in Dublin, 1920s-1960s, Manchester, 2007
 Letters of the Catholic Poor. Poverty in Independent Ireland, 1920-1940, Cambridge University Press, 2017

Articles
 "The rape of Mary M.: A microhistory of sexual violence and moral redemption in 1920s Ireland", Journal of the History of Sexuality, (Jan. 2015)

Sources

Living people
People associated with University College Cork
Alumni of University College Dublin
Members of the Royal Irish Academy
Year of birth missing (living people)
21st-century Irish non-fiction writers
21st-century Irish women writers
Gender studies academics